Infante Philip Peter Gabriel of Spain (7 June 171229 December 1719) was a Spanish infante as the third child and third of four sons born to King Philip V of Spain and his first queen consort, Maria Luisa of Savoy.

Infante Philip Peter Gabriel was born early in the morning of 7 June 1712, at El Escorial in Madrid, the King's official residence, almost three years after the death of his elder brother and namesake, Infante Philip Peter, who had died aged sixteen days.

By Christmas Day 1719, Philip was already very sick. His father arranged for his burial a few days before his death on 29 December 1719. Philip was buried in El Escorial complex.

External links
Infante Philip Peter Gabriel at GeneAll.com
Infante Philip Peter Gabriel at thePeerage.com

1712 births
1719 deaths
House of Bourbon
Burials in the Pantheon of Infantes at El Escorial
Royalty and nobility who died as children
Sons of kings